Playing with Fire: Queer Politics, Queer Theories is a collection of essays on queer theory and political theory from a queer perspective. It was edited by Shane Phelan and published by Routledge on January 14, 1997, making it one of the first scholarly collections by United States political theorists to address the topic of queer politics.

At the time of publication, Feminist Bookstore News described the book as "filled with writings about queer law, politics, and policy," forecasting that it would "do well in university towns and perhaps moderately well with a general audience."

Contents 

 Critically Queer by Judith Butler
 True or False: The Self in Radical Lesbian Feminist Theory by Cynthia Burack
 Dichotomies and Displacement: Bisexuality in Queer Theory and Politics by Stacey Young
 Lesbians and Mestizas: Appropriation and Equivalence by Shane Phelan
 Somewhere Over the Rainbow: Queer Translating by Angelia R. Wilson
 The Centering of Right-Wing Extremism Through the Construction of an "Inclusionary" Homophobia and Racism by Anna Marie Smith
 Community, Rights Talk, and the Communitarian Dissent in Bowers v. Hardwick by Gordon A. Babst
 Essentialism and the Political Articulation of Identity by Gary Lehring
 Intimacy and Equality: The Question of Lesbian and Gay Marriage by Morris B. Kaplan
 Politics, Practices, Publics: Identity and Queer Rights by Paisley Currah
 Queer Problems/Straight Solutions: The Limits of a Politics of "Official Recognition" by Lisa Bower

References 

1997 books
Queer theory
Books by Judith Butler
1990s LGBT literature